The members of the 18th General Assembly of Newfoundland were elected in the Newfoundland general election held in October 1897. The general assembly sat from 1898 to 1900.

The Tory Party led by James Spearman Winter formed the government.

Henry Y. Mott was chosen as speaker.

Sir Henry Edward McCallum served as colonial governor of Newfoundland.

Members of the Assembly 
The following members were elected to the assembly in 1897:

Notes:

By-elections 
By-elections were held to replace members for various reasons:

Notes:

References 

Terms of the General Assembly of Newfoundland and Labrador